Lockie Kratz (born 27 March 2000) is a Canadian rugby union player, currently playing for the New Orleans Gold of Major League Rugby (MLR) and the Canadian national team. His preferred position is centre.

Professional career
Kratz signed for Major League Rugby side New Orleans Gold for the 2021 Major League Rugby season. Kratz made his debut for Canada in the 2021 July rugby union tests.

References

External links
itsrugby.co.uk Profile

2000 births
Living people
Canadian rugby union players
Canada international rugby union players
Rugby union centres
New Orleans Gold players